Still Creek is an accredited Christian school and fully functional ranch  located in unincorporated Brazos County, Texas,  from Bryan, on approximately  of land. Danny and Margaret O'Quinn operated the school from 1988 to 2012, and Steve and Tracy Singleton served as executive directors from 2012 to 2014. Tim Floyd was named the new executive director in March 2015. Beginning in 2017, James Inmon is the director under the title of headmaster.

Still Creek is  a therapeutic boarding school   that serves neglected and abused children, ages 8–18, from all over The United States by providing a structured, Christian environment in which to live and study. In addition to the academic curriculum, Still Creek offers a variety of vocational training such as welding, agriculture, wood shop, and horsemanship classes. Still Creek students participate in the Brazos County Faith Riders Drill Team, which competes in the annual Texas State 4-H Horse Show.

Mission and support
The Ranch's mission is to provide for the spiritual, physical, emotional, and academic needs of the residents and students. The Ranch is a non-profit organization that operates on donations from individuals, businesses, corporations, foundations, civic groups, and churches. Donations go toward general operating expenses, including groceries, utilities, and salaries for the staff members. The Ranch relies heavily on three annual fundraisers.

Members of the community as well as students from nearby Texas A&M University volunteer their time helping at the Ranch.

History
Prior to the coming of the O'Quinns, the land on which Still Creek was built was a children's residential treatment center run by The Answer. When starting the school, Still Creek Ranch leased 14 acres of land that had one school building which had been an old barracks, one building that housed the children, and an old barn. In the first three years, the school served 14 students.

With the assistance of staff member Ken Klein, Still Creek shifted its focus away from residential treatment to being a boarding school for underprivileged children. The mission changed to providing a home for children abandoned by their parents. The home's goal was to provide children with structure, discipline, and education in order to become independent adults.

Initially, Still Creek served only boys. However, an unidentified benefactor donated 20 acres on the condition that a girls’ home be built on the Ranch. In three years, a girls' home had been built with the help of the Jensen Foundation of Dallas, Texas . Later, the landlord who leased the original 14 acres deeded her entire 100 acres to the Ranch.

When the need arrived to build a school building, a four acre lot next to the Ranch came up for sale and a donation was given from a donor in Bryan, Texas that was equal to the sales price. When the foundations to the school were poured, Bibles were placed in each corner. The school was built slowly as donations came in. Volunteers, staff and the boys on the Ranch helped build a mechanic’s shop, a welding shop, a wood shop and horse barns. Every vehicle, piece of furniture, and other furnishings were donated.

In 2005, Still Creek bought a 100 acre strip of land with the help of the Jensen Foundation. The land supports oil wells that provide a steady income to the Ranch. Later, a donor bought 15 acres of land adjoining Still Creek Ranch and built a covered horse arena with numerous horse stalls, a kitchen, and bathrooms.

In May 2012, Steve and Tracy Singleton took over management at Still Creek while the O'Quinns retired to New Mexico to start a summer camp for abused children. The Singletons were former directors of Happy Hill Farm Academy in Granbury, Texas.

In 2013, Still Creek launched Restore Her, a ministry specifically focused on the restoration of minor girls who had either been trafficked or who had been exposed to the commercial sex industry. In 2014, a third girls' house was completed.

In March 2015, Tim Floyd was named the new executive director of Still Creek Ranch. He and his wife Lori previously served as house parents at the New Mexico Baptist Children's Home. Prior to that, Tim served as the program director for Open Door Ministries in Denver, Colorado.

Accreditation and facilities
Still Creek Ranch is accredited by the Southern Association of Colleges and Schools and has been accredited since 1991. The school is interdenominational and not affiliated with any particular church.

The ranch has three homes for boys and two homes for girls, a school, staff housing, various shops, and a roofed arena for riding and horse shows. Covering , the arena is among the largest in the region. The school also has a computer lab, science lab, library, weight room, and gymnasium.

References

External links
 Still Creek Ranch official website
 Texas A&M University Agronomy Society Activities
 Still Creek Boys Ranch Inc.
 Rod Run to showcase vehicles, old and new, in College Station June 12-13
 Still Creek Boys and Girls Ranch Profile at Christianvolunteering.org
 Still Creek Ranch Students Help Out With Pet Day

Private K-12 schools in Texas
Private boarding schools in Texas
Schools in Brazos County, Texas
Therapeutic boarding schools in the United States